A confessional is a small, enclosed booth used for confession.

Confessional may also refer to:
 Confessional (reality television), common interview practice in reality television
 The Confessional, a French movie from 1994
 The Confessional (album), a 2008 mixtape by Bishop Lamont
 Confessional (TV series), a 1989 ITV drama television series
 Confessional (film), a 2007 Cebuano mockumentary indie film
 Confessional (Bryan Rice album), 2006
Confessional (Janet Devlin album), 2020
 Confessional Lutheran, Lutheran Christians
 The Confessionals, a group of anonymous online forums

See also
Confessional community
Confessional poetry
Confessional state
Confessional writing
Confessionalism (disambiguation)